Oswind Suriya Rosayro is a former Singaporean  footballer of Sri Lankan Burgher descent who played for Woodlands Wellington FC, primarily in the Prime League as a midfielder. Oswind was normally deployed as an attacking midfielder, winger or striker. He can also play goalkeeper, central defender, and wing back.

Oswind first rose to prominence during his early playing days with Glasgow Hotspurs. And during the 2011 S.League season, where he was promoted to the S.League squad and featured in 2 first team matches in his first season. During the 2012 season, Oswind scored his first senior goal for Woodlands Wellington in a S.League match against Gombak United on 26 August 2012.

Apart from football, Oswind is also an accomplished floorball player who participated in the Singapore Floorball League in his teens and has represented the Singapore national floorball team at international level. He is currently an international floorball referee.

Club career statistics

Oswind Suriya's Profile

All numbers encased in brackets signify substitute appearances.

References

1989 births
Living people
Singaporean footballers
Woodlands Wellington FC players
Singapore Premier League players
Association football midfielders
Floorball players
Singaporean people of Sri Lankan descent
Burgher sportspeople
Hougang United FC players